Hakan Karahan (born 1 January 1960), also known with his pseudonym Sinan, is a Turkish writer and songwriter. He wrote several songs for Candan Erçetin and was producer for the movies Kaptan Feza and Gölgesizler.

Books 
 Yeni Başlayanlar İçin Aikido (1996, Alfa Yayınları)
 Ama Öyle! (2006, Alfa Yayınları)

Poems:
 Kafamdaki Ses (1998, Scala Yayıncılık)
 İntizar (2000, Scala Yayıncılık)

Novels:
 Sürüden Ayrı (2001, Alfa Yayınları)
 19 (2004, Alfa Yayınları)
 Azrail (2005, Alfa Yayınları)
 Kıyamet Haritası (2007, Altın Kitaplar)
 Nehirde Kayan Yıldızlar (2012, Altın Kitaplar)
 Abluka (2014, Self published)

List of songs by Sinan

Filmography

Television

Film

References

External links 
  
 

1960 births
Turkish novelists
Turkish male screenwriters
Turkish male poets
Living people